Thomas Mavros (born 31 May 1954) is a Greek former professional footballer who played as a striker. He was "the flag" of AEK Athens, that led the club to huge success, during the 70's and 80's. Mavros is regarded as one of the best players to play club football in Greece having scored a record number of 260 goals in the Greek championship and played for the World XI in 1984. In 2012 he also served as the president of AEK Athens. His nickname was "The God", or "Theomas".

Early life
Mavros was born on 31 May 1954 in Kallithea, where he lived for the first 4 years of his life, until his family moved to Paleo Faliro. His father, Michalis, despite not being a footballer, he was a huge fan of football. Ever since he was just 5 years old, his father used to take Mavros and his brother in the yard of their house every morning, from 7 to 9 and taught them how to play the ball, as he tried to teach them everything about football, helping them to consolidate as he went them every Sunday to the Nea Smyrni Stadium to watch Panionios. His the elder brother of Sotiris, soon joined the children section of Panionios. For the 7-year-old Mavros, it all started on a winter Sunday in 1961, after his father refused to go to the stadium due to bad weather. Mavros decided to go alone to Nea Smyrni for a match of Panionios against Pierikos. He waited outside the locker rooms of the stadium and caught the attention of the then leader of the club, Takis Papoulidis, who urged Mavros to go out with rest of the team for the warm-up. At the instigation of Papoulidis, the two of them played "headers", reaching 65 without dropping the ball, marking the beginning of his football career. Papoulidis, distinguishing the talent and abilities of the little Mavros, urged him to come to every match in the uniform of Panionios and to enter the pitch with the team as their mascot. In the first match in which Mavros went as a mascot, Panionios defeated Olympiacos by 1–0 and the little one earned 100 drachmas for the luck he brought to the team.

Club career

Panionios
At the age of 11, Mavros joined the infrastructure departments of the club and began his intensive involvement with football. A bad circumstance related to the disappointment of his own from his brother's exclusion in the teenage section brought him to train with Olympiacos. There, Elias Yfantis immediately recognized his value and asked him to join the team. The refusal of Panionios in giving his sport's card prevented the transfer disappointed the teenage Mavros to the point of abstaining from the activities of Panionios. The gap was bridged by the curator of the team Papidas, after a visit to his house and a promise to 14-year-old Thomas for participation in the youth team. There, he worked under Dezső Bundzsák at the beginning and later Joe Mallett who distinguished and cultivated his talent, becoming the youngest player to have played in a Greek Championship match, at the age of 16, as well as the youngest scorer when at 17 January 1971, he scored the only goal in the 65th minute against Pierikos on 1–0 victory. He also became an international at a very young age whilst not playing for any of the top clubs. On 16 September 1971, he made his European debut against Atlético Madrid in the first round of the UEFA Cup. His appearance made him the then youngest player of a Greek football club to have ever played in a European competition. Initially Mavros played as a left winger and later as a striker, where he showed his scoring abilities, provoking the interest from the big teams of Greek football.

AEK Athens
In 1975, the president of AEK Athens, Loukas Barlos wanted to sign the young striker, but Panionios board refused to give their best player. The expression of interest from AEK in the summer of 1975 clashed with the uncompromisingly negative attitude of the people of Panionios. AEK was about to live again the adventures of the transfer of Kostas Nestoridis in 1955. The desire of Mavros to play for the great AEK of the time, as well as his unlimited appreciation in the person of Barlos were enough to surpass the inexplicable and obsession of the president of Panionios, Tsolakakis to cancel the transfer. It was then revealed that when Mavros signed his contract with Panionios, was still underage, thus making the contract invalid. Panionios still blocked the transfer leading to a litigation between the two sides which lasted for an entire season. During this period, Mavros was unable to play for either side. After the dispute was resolved Mavros was finally transferred to AEK Athens in June 1976.

The happy ending of the case brought on the one hand the joy and satisfaction to both Barlos and Mavros who have since adapted a "father-son" relationship. He immediately became an integral part of the team helping them reach the semi-finals of the UEFA Cup, winning 2 Championships and 2 Cups including a domestic double in 1978. He was also top scorer 3 times (1978 with 22 goals, 1979 with 31 goals, 1985 with 27 goals). In 1979, he was also the second goalscorer in Europe, 3 goals behind AZ's player, Kees Kist. He formed alongside Dušan Bajević one the club's best scoring couple and one of the best in Europe. The fans of AEK Athens loved him because he was one of the few players who stayed with the club after Barlos left and because of his tendency to score against rivals Olympiacos. They named him, the lexicographer, Faidon Konstantoudakis came up with the nickname "Theomas" (paraphrase of his first name to resemble the Greek word for God) and whenever he scored the whole stadium chanted "Who, who, who? Mavros the God".

The era after the departure of Barlos, was marked with administrative and financial instability, while the transfers did not live up to the expectations, as the team was getting weaker in every season. In that period of decline for the club, Mavros stayed and with his leading presence held the team from falling apart. On 18 August 1981 Mavros was called to Europe XI to play against Czechoslovakia for the 80th anniversary of the Czechoslovak Football Association. He led the club in the qualification at the expense Olympiacos, in the quarter-finals of the Cup with 2 wins and his goal in the victory by 0–1 in the second leg at Karaiskakis Stadium. In the counterattack of AEK that led to the goal, Mavros got the ball at the center of the field and dribbled to the opposite area and many fans of the red whites started leaving the stadium confident of the upcoming goal of Mavros and the consequent elimination of their team. In the Final against PAOK at Olympic Stadium, his goals and another by Vangelis Vlachos led the club to win a title after 4 years. In the following season he renewed his cortact with the club receiving 45 million drachmas from the then president, Lefteris Panagidis. On 22 June 1984, Mavros was called to the World XI alongside his countryman Vasilis Hatzipanagis and other legends like Franz Beckenbauer, Ruud Krol, Johan Neeskens, Peter Shilton, Kevin Keegan, Mario Kempes, Hugo Sánchez and Felix Magath. 20,000 Greek fans were in Giants Stadium to watch World XI playing against New York Cosmos in a 3–1 win. In fact, according to his statement, in the game, Beckenbauer told him "At last, you came.", meaning the constant interest of his team, New York Cosmos for Mavros. On 27 January 1985 Mavros also became one of the nine Greek players in history of who have scored 5 goals in a match against Egaleo in a 5–2 win. In 1987, AEK' manager Nikos Alefantos asked the club's president, Andreas Zafiropoulos not to renew Mavros' contract as he thought the player was "too old" to play for a team of that level. All the above were confirmed on April 11, 1987, in the home match against Apollon Kalamarias, when Alefantos subbed off Mavros at the 80th minute, being booed by all AEK fans. Zafiropoulos agreed to the coach's request and Mavros was released from the club and returned to his former club, Panionios.

Return to Panionios
Mavros proved wrong the coach and administration of AEK Athens, with his return in Nea Smyrni. With Panionios, in 1990 he finished as top scorer in league  with 22 goals, at the age of 36, being the oldest player in Greece to ever win this award. Mavros lived one the greatest moments of his career when on 28 October 1989 on his return in Nea Filadelfeia, as an opponent of AEK. In the 27th minute, doing what he knows best, equalized the match for Panionios. Mavros didn't celebrate the goal. Thousands of AEK's fans on the stands, stood on their feet and chanted his name as if he had just scored for AEK, showing their love and appreciation to his face, forcing Mavros to applaud them and send them kisses, wiping away a tear of joy. Before retiring in 1991, Mavros managed to score a total of 51 goals in 89 matches on his second spell at the club and surpassed his former teammate at AEK Athens, Mimis Papaioannou as the all-time top scorer in the Greek Championship.

Retirement
On 14 November 1993 he hung up his shoes in the friendly match where Greece faced AEK, which was organized in his honor. The match ended 4–2 for AEK and Mavros scored three goals in the last game of his glorious career, playing with both teams.

International career
Mavros' international career is enviable although much has been heard about its unfair end in 1982. He played for Greece's Youth team from 1972 to 1974, with which he scored 4 goals in the matches for the European Championship. Two goals against Yugoslavia and one goal on 16/1/74 against Malta. Then he played with Greece U21 and on 31/5/1972 he scored the winning goal in the semifinal of the European Championship in the 2–1 victory over Czechoslovakia. At the age of 17 he became the youngest player to ever score for the men's squad. Mavros had a total of 36 appearances with Greece scoring 11 goals in the period of 1972–1984. His most notable moment was his presence in the 1980's European Championship.

Personal life
Mavros is married to the former basketball player of Palaio Faliro, Angeliki Agorastopoulou and they have two sons, Dimitris and Sotiris and a daughter, Ioanna.

After football
After retiring from football Mavros engaged in business of restaurant services. Although he was repeatedly offered the position of coach or manager of AEK, he stubbornly refused, not agreeing with the situation of the club in general. In 2007 he opened his own coffee bar in the marina of Alimos. On 1 August 2012, Mavros became the president of his beloved AEK in an effort to help the club to hold up from the financial struggles, forming a new team based on young players with Vangelis Vlachos as a coach and Vasilios Tsiartas as a technical director, but it was without result. He resigned on 30 September 2012, when he found out attempts to bypass his decisions with the removal of Vlachos, who he had chosen, being the triggering event. In 2017 he published his autobiography with the title "Who, who, who? Mavros the God". His name is honoured on one of the four pillars of AEK Athens' new stadium, Agia Sophia Stadium, alongside other important figures of the club's history such as Kostas Nestoridis, Stelios Serafidis and Mimis Papaioannou.

Records
Greek championship all-time top scorer with 260 goals.
Most goals in a league game with 5 goals in a 5–2 win against Egaleo on 27 January 1985.
Most goals scored in the derbies against Olympiacos with 16 goals.

Career statistics

Club
{| class="wikitable" style="text-align:center"
|-
!colspan=3|Club performance
!colspan=2|League
!colspan=2|Greek Cup
!colspan=2|Europe
!colspan=2|Total
|-
!Season!!Club!!League
!Apps!!Goals!!Apps!!Goals!!Apps!!Goals!!Apps!!Goals
|-
|1970–71
|rowspan=6|Panionios
|rowspan=21|Alpha Ethniki
|24||2||1||0||0||0||25||2
|-
|1971–72
|23||3||3||1||0||0||26||4
|-
|1972–73
|29||9||2||0||0||0||31||9
|-
|1973–74
|30||10||2||1||0||0||32||11
|-
|1974–75
|29||11||4||2||0||0||33||13
|-
|1975–76
|0||0||0||0||0||0||0||0
|-
|1976–77
|rowspan=11|AEK Athens
|30||18||2||0||10||3||42||21
|-
|1977–78
|33||22||5||8||4||1||42||31
|-
|1978–79
|33||31||6||7||4||2||43||40
|-
|1979–80
|28||14||3||5||2||0||34||19
|-
|1980–81
|22||9||6||3||1||3||29||15
|-
|1981–82
|30||17||2||2||0||0||32||19
|-
|1982–83
|32||19||7||12||2||0||43||31
|-
|1983–84
|21||13||6||4||2||0||29||17
|-
|1984–85
|29||27||0||0||0||0||29||27
|-
|1985–86
|17||4||4||0||1||0||22||4
|-
|1986–87
|3||0||0||0||0||0||3||0
|-
|1987–88
|rowspan=4|Panionios
|29||16||4||2||0||0||33||18
|-
|1988–89
|22||12||1||0||0||0||23||12
|-
|1989–90
|33||22||3||2||0||0||36||24
|-
|1990–91
|5||1||0||0||0||0||5||1
|-
! colspan=3|Career total
!502||260||61||49||26||9||590||318

International

Honours

AEK Athens
Alpha Ethniki: 1977–78, 1978–79
Greek Cup: 1977–78, 1982–83

Individual
Alpha Ethniki top scorer: 1977–78, 1978–79, 1984–85, 1989–90
European Silver Shoe: 1978–79

Style of play
 Mavros was an agile stiker and an incredibly nimble footballer with the ability to always be in the right position to score. The extra personal training he followed with weights, sand runs and other original methods for the time, increased his body strength and explosiveness and gave him incredimbe jump, which made him the most difficult player to mark on the pitch, even for the best defenders. The result of his enhanced physical condition was to be able to maintain his level at the age of 36. He was a natural leader on the pitch, as his presence he boosted the morale of his teammates and cheered the crowd to create a hot atmosphere from the stands. At the same time, he was the terror of the opponent defenders and goalkeepers which made them nervous with the idea that would find a way to score against them. His leadership skills helped AEK Athens hold up during financial and admistative difficulties that led to a downfall on the competitive part.

References

External links

1954 births
Living people
AEK Athens F.C. players
AEK Athens F.C. chairmen
Panionios F.C. players
Greece international footballers
UEFA Euro 1980 players
Super League Greece players
Association football forwards
Footballers from Athens
Greek footballers